Matthew English (born 14 November 1997) is an English professional rugby league footballer who plays as a  for the Huddersfield Giants in the Super League and the England Knights at international level.

He spent time on loan from Huddersfield at the Dewsbury Rams in the Betfred Championship.

Background
English was born in Huddersfield, West Yorkshire, England.

Playing career
English is a product of Huddersfield's academy system and is nicknamed 'The polar bear'.
He represented England academy on tour to Australia 
In 2017, he made his Challenge Cup début for Huddersfield against the Swinton Lions.
On 28 May 2022, English played for Huddersfield in their 2022 Challenge Cup Final loss to Wigan.

International career
In 2019 Matty was called into the England Knights squad along with 3 other Giants players 

In 2019 he was selected for the England Knights against Jamaica at Headingley Rugby Stadium.

References

External links
Huddersfield Giants profile
SL profile
	

1997 births
Living people
Dewsbury Rams players
England Knights national rugby league team players
English rugby league players
Huddersfield Giants players
Rugby league props
Rugby league players from Huddersfield